TKJ may refer to:

Tok Junction Airport, an airport in Alaska
Tokai Transport Service Company, a railway company in Japan